Robert Adair (3 January 1900 – 10 August 1954) was an American-born British actor. He was born in San Francisco. He was also known as Robert A'Dair, the name by which he was billed in Journey's End (1930).

Adair died of leukemia in London.

Selected filmography
 Journey's End (1930)
 The Dover Road (1934)
 The Girl Who Came Back (1935)
 London by Night (1937)
 The Ticket of Leave Man (1937)
 What a Man! (1938)
 The Face at the Window (1939)
 It's Hard to Be Good (1948)
 Portrait of Clare (1950)
 There Is Another Sun (1951)
 There Was a Young Lady (1953)
 Park Plaza 605 (1953)
 Eight O'Clock Walk (1954)

References

Sources
The Actors Compendium (includes photos)

External links

1900 births
1954 deaths
American emigrants to the United Kingdom
British male film actors
British male television actors
American male film actors
American male television actors
20th-century American male actors
20th-century British male actors
Deaths from leukemia
Deaths from cancer in England
Male actors from San Francisco